Pareuidella is a genus of delphacid planthoppers in the family Delphacidae. There are about five described species in Pareuidella.

Species
These five species belong to the genus Pareuidella:
 Pareuidella avicephaliforma Beamer, 1951
 Pareuidella magnistyla (Crawford, 1914)
 Pareuidella spatulata Beamer, 1951
 Pareuidella triloba (Metcalf, 1923)
 Pareuidella weedi (Van Duzee, 1897)

References

Further reading

 
 
 

Delphacinae
Auchenorrhyncha genera
Articles created by Qbugbot